Sergiu Floroaia (born December 1, 1984), known professionally by the mononym Sergiu, is a Romanian stand-up comedian and comedy writer. He is one of the first Romanians to be featured on Comedy Central Extra, with six comedy specials. He hosted, together with Andrei Ciobanu, the morning show on Romanian radio station Kiss FM (Romania). His style of humour is based on topical events, dark humour and the use of edgy one-liners.

Sergiu started doing comedy in 2006 at an open-mic night in Cafe Deko. His early influencers were Steven Wright, Demetri Martin, Jimmy Carr and later Anthony Jeselnik.

In 2013, Sergiu partnered with Andrei Ciobanu, also a comedian, and wrote "Unu-ntr-altu'" and "Mica rugăminte", two musical parody videos that became instant hits on YouTube.

International career
Sergiu is one of the first two Romanian comedians, together with Toma Alexandru, to perform stand-up comedy in English on Comedy Central Extra. He was the opening act for Eddie Griffin in Bucharest for the 'Living Legend Tour' show.

In 2016, together with Toma Alexandru and Radu Isac, Sergiu Floroaia performed and produced "The Romanians Are Here" - their first show at the Edinburgh Fringe Festival in Scotland.

Filmography

Television

Internet

Stand-up specials
In 2013, Sergiu teamed up with Media Pro to release his first stand-up special on the video-on-demand service Voyo.

Awards
 Gene Perret’s “Words To Live By” Joke Writing Contest Winner – 2014
 Best Viral for “Who Are Sergiu And Andrei?” – Internetics 2014
 Best Viral for “Mă-ta are cratimă” (musical comedy video – co-writer) – Webstock 2012
 Silver in the Viral Category for “Cărți! Te fac neprost” (sketch video – co-writer) – Webstock 2012
 UGC Award – Tic Tac Fresh Comedy (writer & performer) – Webstock 2011
 Jury Award for “Cahfu” (animation – co-writer) – Grand Spoof 2013

References

Living people
Romanian comedians
1984 births